Alamikamba Airport  is an airstrip serving the Prinzapolka River village of Alamikamba in the North Caribbean Coast Autonomous Region, Nicaragua.

See also

 List of airports in Nicaragua
 Transport in Nicaragua

References

External links
 Jim Drebert's Gallery Four gallery photos
 HERE Maps - Alamikamba
 OpenStreetMap - Alamikamba
 OurAirports - Alamikamba
 Alamikamba

Airports in Nicaragua